The following is a list of players, both past and current, who appeared at least in one game for the Seattle Mariners franchise.

Players in Bold are members of the National Baseball Hall of Fame.

Players in italics have had their numbers retired by the team.

A

, P, 2009–2010
, P, 1977–1981, 1983
, P, 1998–2002
, P, 1992
, 2B/OF, 2011–2015
, P, 2019
, P, 1992
, P, 2019
, P, 2017
, C, 2010
, P, 1981
, 3B, 1983
, 2B, 1980–1981
, DH, 1983
, 1B, 2017
, P, 2016-2020
, IF/OF, 1991–1998
, OF, 2013–2014
, P, 1981–1982
, SS, 1980–1981
, P, 1980
, P, 2021
, SS/2B, 2013
, OF, 2017
, P, 2021
, OF, 1994
, OF, 2016
, P, 2018-2019
, P, 2016
, P, 2004–2005
, SS, 1981
, SS, 2004
, P, 1994–1998
, P, 1993

B

, 2B, 1993
, P, 2004, 2006–2008
, 2B, 1977–1978
, 1B, 1988
, P, 2002
, OF, 2007–2009
, P, 1987–1991
, P, 1979–1982
, C, 2013
, C, 2010
, P, 1984–1985
, P, 2015
, P, 1992
, P, 2007–2009
, P, 2019
, P, 2019
, 1B, 2021
, OF, 2013
, DH, 1978–1979
, P, 1984
, P, 1980–1986
, P, 2011–2014
, 2B, 2017-2018
, SS, 2019
, P, 2008–2011
, P, 2014–2015
, P, 1995
, 3B/2B, 1998–2001
, 3B, 2005–2009
, P, 1995
, OF, 1980
, P, 2003
, P, 2016
, P, 2017-2018
, P, 2022-Present
, 2B, 1983
, DH, 1977–1979
, P, 1983–1986
, SS, 2005–2009
, P, 2019
, OF, 2019-2021
, P, 1981
, P, 2004
, C, 2013
, IF/OF, 2002–2008, 2014–2015
, 3B, 1992–1995, 1997, 1999
, OF, 2004
, 1B/OF, 1978–1982
, OF, 2006
, P, 2013  
, OF, 1984–1986
, 2B, 1992–1993, 2001–2005
, OF, 2006
, C, 2001–2004, 2005
, P, 1982
, P, 2022
, P, 1993–1996
, P, 1994
, OF, 1982
, SS, 1999
, P, 2022
, P, 2018-2019
, OF, 2010–2011
, OF, 1983–1987
, C, 1986–1992
, OF, 1994–1996
, P, 1979
, OF, 1986–1989
, 1B, 2009–2010
, P, 2022-Present
, OF, 1977–1978
, P, 2019-2020
, OF, 1988–1992
, 1B, 2006–2007
, OF, 1982
, P, 1992
, P, 1986–1987
, P, 1978
, OF, 2019
, OF, 2019
, SS, 1990
, OF, 2005
, C, 2014
, OF, 1988–2001
, C, 1981–1983
, P, 1998
, P, 1999
, P, 1990–1991
, C, 2007–2009
, P, 1977–1978
, OF, 1981
, OF, 2010

C

, IF/OF, 2004
, IF, 2008
, OF, 1984–1986
, OF, 2000–2003
, P, 2016
, 1B, 2021
, P, 1987–1989
, P, 2005–2007
, 2B, 2014–2018
, P, 2012–2013
, P, 2019
, P, 1995–1997, 1999
, 1B, 2009–2012
, P, 2003
, C, 2022
, P, 2021-Present
, P, 2022-Present
, 3B, 1982–1983
, C, 2015
, P, 1982–1983
, IF, 1999
, IF-OF, 2009
, DH/OF, 1983–1985
, P, 2021
, P, 1993, 1995–1997, 2001
, OF, 2009, 2013–2014
, C, 1998
, P, 2017
, P, 2006
, OF, 2005–2006
, OF, 1987
, 3B, 2002–2003
, P, 2016-2017 
, P, 1981–1983, 1990
, P, 1987
, P, 1981
, C, 2007–2008
, C, 2016
, P, 1997–1999
, P, 2017
, IF/OF, 1989–1992
, P, 1978
, 1B, 2003
, OF, 1995
, 3B/OF, 1983–1985, 1988–1990
, OF, 1977
, P, 2018
, P, 2010
, P, 1989–1991
, P, 1993–1995
, P, 2018
, 2B, 1995–1998
, P, 2008–2009
, P, 2010
, P, 2010–2011
, P, 2020
, OF, 1988–1993
, 3B, 2019
, OF, 1982–1986
, C, 1977, 1979–1980
, 3B, 1980
, OF, 1998
, OF, 1979–1980
, SS, 2019-Present
, P, 2002
, P, 2006
, OF, 1997
, 2B, 1977–1983
, OF/DH, 2015–2018
, SS, 1982–1983
, P, 1993–1995
, P, 2017
, DH, 2011

D

, P, 1994
, P, 1999
, 1B/DH, 1984–1991
, C, 2002–2004
, P, 2007
, 3B, 1996–1999
, P, 1994–1997
, P, 1995–1996
, P, 1979
, P, 2017
, P, 2011–2012
, P, 1989
, OF, 1977
, P, 1990–1993
, OF, 2014
, P, 2018
, OF, 1995–1996
, P, 2016-2018
, SS, 1987–1989
, P, 2008
, 3B, 2004–2006
, P, 2021
, P, 1981
, P, 1979–1980
, OF, 1997–1998
, P, 2021
, P, 2018
, P, 2019-2021
, P, 1989
, OF, 2017

E

, P, 1990
, 3B, 1980–1983
, P, 2020
, P, 2014–2015, 2018-2019, 2022
, 2B, 2022
, OF, 2007
, DH, 2019
, P, 1977
, OF, 2020
 2B, 2017
, IF, 1997
, C, 1982
, OF/DH, 2006

F

, OF, 2022
, P, 2013–2015
, P, 1997–1999
, P, 2006–2008
, OF, 1993
, SS, 1994–1995
, P, 2018-Present 
, OF, 1988–1989
, P, 2017
, IF, 2010–2012
, P, 1986
, C, 1981–1982
, P, 1992
, P, 2009–2011
, P, 2002
, P, 1991–1995
, P, 2020-2021
, P, 2021-Present 
, 1B, 2022
, P, 1998
, C, 1977
, OF, 2019-2021
, 1B, 2020-Present
, 2B, 2013–2014
, P, 1999, 2001–2005
, P, 2020
, 2B/OF, 2022
, 1B, 2016-2017
, C, 2018-2019
, P, 2009–2010
, P, 1995
, P, 2006
, P, 2001
, P, 2011–2015

G

, P, 1998
, P, 1977, 1981
, P, 2017
, OF, 2016–2018
, P, 1999–2004
, P, 1990
, P, 2017-2019
, 2B, 1997
, P, 2017
, P, 2019
, P, 1984–1985
, P, 2020
, 2021-Present
, 2B, 1990
, P, 2022
, OF, 2014
, OF, 1998–2002
, P, 1981–1982
, P, 1994
, C, 2011
, C, 2021
, P, 2018
, P, 2017-Present 
, OF, 2020
, C, 2005
, P, 1994
, C, 2017
, P, 1992
, P, 2020-2021
, 1B, 1981–1982
, P, 2011
, IF, 2007
, P, 2006–2008
, OF, 1990–1991
, OF, 1989–1999, 2009–2010
, P, 2018
, P, 2019-2020
, P, 2015–2016
, P, 2004–2006
, P, 1984, 1986–1987, 1995–1996
, SS, 1997–1999
, P, 2019-2020
, SS, 1998–2003
, OF, 2007
, C, 1981
, P, 1992
, OF, 2009–2013, 2015–2016

H

, UT, 2020-Present
, P, 1999–2002
, OF, 1978–1979
, IF-OF, 2009
, OF, 2010–2011
, OF, 2022
, P, 1993
, OF, 2017-2022
, 3B, 2009
, OF, 2017
, 3B, 2004–2005
, P, 1988–1993
, P, 2015
, P, 1995–1996
, P, 2013
, P, 1989–1992
, P, 2005–2006
, OF, 2014
, P, 2002–2005
, C, 1992–1994
, 1B, 2018-2019
, P, 1980
, C, 1992
, OF, 1981–1986
, OF, 2000
, OF, 1983–1984
, OF, 1986–1988
, P, 1999
, P, 1993
, OF, 2016-2018
, 2B, 2000
, P, 2005–2019
, C, 2018
, P, 2017
, P, 1994
, C, 2015
, OF, 1998
, C, 1980
, P, 1994
, P, 1999
, P, 1979
, P, 2020
, P, 1996
, P, 2000
, P, 1998
, 3B, 1996
, P, 1993
, P, 1989–1991
, P, 1997
, P, 1977–1980
, OF, 1979–1980
, P, 1977–1978
, C, 1991, 1993–1994
, OF, 1992–1993
, P, 2006–2007
, C, 2020
, P, 1986–1987
, 2B, 2008
, OF, 1999
, 1B, 1996
, P, 1996–1997
, OF, 1999
, IF, 1998

I

, C, 2016
, OF, 1996–2000, 2004–2008, 2013
, P 2012–2017

J

, OF, 2014–2015
, P, 1988–1991, 1996
, 1B, 1999
, 1B, 2004
, P, 2009
, OF, 2022
, P, 2004
, C/DH 2012
, OF, 2000–2001
, DH, 1994
, P, 2006, 2008
, DH 2012
, OF, 2007–2008
, C, 2006–2009
, P, 1989–1998
, C, 2007–2010
, P, 2016
, OF, 2006–2007
, P, 1991–1992
, OF, 2014–2015
, P, 1979
, P, 1977–1978
, SS, 1986
, OF, 1977–1979
, OF, 1990–1991
, 1B, 1996
, C, 1977

K

, P, 2016
, SS/2B, 2012
, P, 2002
, C, 1984–1987
, P, 1977
, 2021-Present
, P, 2009–2012
, OF, 1997
, 2B, 2011
, P, 2015
, P, 2004–2005
, P, 2019-2021
, P, 1993–1995
, OF, 1987–1989
, OF, 2001–2002
, P, 2012
, P, 2022-Present
, P, 1996
, P, 1990
, C, 2022
, P, 2022
, 1B, 2010
, P, 1992
, C, 1995
, P, 1991, 1995

L

, P, 1986
, P, 2011
, P, 2013
, 1B, 2008
, P, 2020-2021
, OF, 2022
, C, 1999–2001
, OF, 2009–2010, 2011
, P, 1984–1989
, OF, 2022-Present 
, P, 2017-2018
, OF, 2006
, P, 1977
, P, 1985
, P, 2010–2012
, P, 2017-2019
, P, 1992–1993
, P, 2016, 2018-2019
, P, 2010
, 1B, 2016
, P, 1999
, OF, 1991–1992
, OF, 1989–1990
, P, 2014–2015
, 3B, 2004
, OF, 2000
, P, 1979, 1985
, OF, 2019-2022
, 3B, 2011–2012
, 1B, 2016
, P, 1997–1998
, 1B, 1977
, 2B, 1993
, P, 2006
, P, 2020
, P, 2013
, P, 1985
, SS, 2019-2021
, P, 2003
, OF, 2019-2020
, OF, 1977
, 2B, 2004–2010
, 2B, 2004
, P, 1998
, P, 1990
, P, 1994
, P, 1997
, P, 2006–2010, 2015
, P, 2011
, P, 2012–2015

M

, OF, 1999–2000, 2003
, P, 1977
, C, 2000
, P, 2017
, OF, 1994
, P, 1997
, P, 2004–2005
, 3B, 1993
, P, 2019-2020
, 1B, 1981–1983
, 3B, 2010
, 3B, 1996
, P, 1997
, P, 2020-2022
, C, 2017-2018
, P, 2019
, OF, 2020-2021
, P, 2017
, P, 1999
, SS, 2015–2016
, OF, 2000–2001
, P, 2016-2017
, OF, 2016
, P, 1997
, DH, 1987–2004
, OF, 1996
, 1B, 1990–1995
, C, 1996–1998
, P, 2002–2007
, OF, 1987
, P, 2013–2014
, OF, 2020
, 3B, 2021
, P, 1996–1998
, 1B, 1998
, P, 2021-Present
, P, 2019
, OF, 2004
, C, 1988–1989
, SS, 1981–1982
, P, 2019
, P, 1977–1980
, 2B, 2000–2003
, SS, 1977
, P, 1996
, P, 1999–2000, 2003–2006
, P, 1995
, P, 1977
, P, 2013–2015
, P, 1990
, P, 1990
, SS, 1979–1980
, P, 1996
, C, 1982–1984
, P, 1999–2000
, P, 2008–2009
, 1B, 1977–1981
, 2B, 2003
, P, 2021
, OF, 1999
, P, 1996
, 2B, 1977–1980, 1984
. P, 2015-2016
, SS, 2013–2015
, P, 2012
, P, 2020-2022
, P, 2019, 2022-Present
, P, 1996
, P, 1984–1986
, 2016-2018
, P, 2020-2022
, OF, 1994
, OF, 1992
, P, 1977–1979
, OF, 1998–1999
, P, 1977–1979
, P, 2015–2016
, P, 1987
, DH/C, 2012–2015
, P, 2020-2021
, P, 2017-2019
, C, 2009–2011
, UT, 2020-Present
, P, 1982–1988
, P, 1977
, 1B/DH, 2013, 2014
, P, 1985–1987
, P, 2018
, 1B, 2014–2015
, P, 2007–2009
, SS,/OF 2005–2008, 2013
, OF, 1982–1987, 1992
, SS, 2017-2018
, P, 1996–2006
, P, 1996
, P, 2021-Present
, P, 2022-Present
, P, 1991
, C, 2019-Present
, P, 1982
, P, 2004

N

, P, 2004–2006
, C, 1984
, C, 1980–1981, 1987
, C, 2019
, SS, 2006
, 1B, 2018-2019
, P, 1982–1983
, C, 1983
, P, 1992–1995, 2001–2003, 2005
, OF, 1983–1986
, OF, 1993–1995
, P, 2020-2021
, OF, 1995
, P, 2018
, P, 1989
, OF, 2018
, P, 2021
, OF, 1987
, P, 2012–2014
, C 2019-2020
, IF/OF, 2008
, C, 2021
, P, 1982–1988
, P, 2015–2016

O

, 1B, 1990–1993
, P, 2022-Present
, C, 2020
, SS, 2002
, P, 2006–2008
, C, 2005
, C, 2022-Present
, 1B, 2000–2004
, P, 1997
, C, 1998, 2000
, C, 2004–2005, 2011–2012
, P, 2015
, P, 2009–2010
, P, 2015 
, OF, 2015–2016
, P, 1993
, 1B/DH, 1992–1996
, P, 2017
, SS, 1983–1986

P

, OF, 1978–1981
, 2B, 2021-2022
, P, 1977
, P, 2017
, P, 1998–2001
, P, 2016
, P, 1987, 1992
, P, 2007
, C, 1992
, P, 1978–1981
, OF, 1981
, C, 1977–1978
, P, 2010–2011
, P, 2013–2018, 2021
, P, 2017-2018
, OF, 2011–2013
, DH, 2011
, P, 2016
, 2B, 1984–1985
, 1B, 2006
, P, 2012–2013
, OF, 1998
, P, 1982–1983
, 1B, 2006
, P, 2017
, DH, 1983–1988
, P, 2011
, P, 2000–2006
, 1B, 1993–1996
, P, 1993–1994
, C, 1978
, OF, 2001–2002
, P, 1977–1978
, P, 2017
, OF, 1991
, OF, 2017
, P, 1987–1990, 1992–1993
, P, 1993
, 3B, 1995
, 3B, 1984–1989
, P, 2012–2014
, 1B, 1983–1984
, P, 2003–2008

Q

, SS, 1986–1989
, C, 2013–2014
, C, 2006, 2009–2010

R

, 3B, 1997
, C, 1988
, OF, 1998
, C, 2021-Present
, P, 2012–2014, 2017-2018
, P, 2007
, P, 2020-2022
, SS, 1982–1987
, P, 1999–2000
, 3B, 1981–1982
, P, 2015
, P, 1978–1981
, P, 2011
, P, 2022-Present 
, OF, 2004–2008
, P, 1986–1990
, P, 2007
, SS, 2002
, 2B, 1987–1988
, 1B, 1982
, SS, 1977–1978
, 2B, 1983–1992
, P, 2000–2003, 2008
, P, 1991
, P, 2021
, P, 1994–1995
, C, 2004–2006
, P, 2016
, P, 1980
, OF, 1978–1980
, 1B, 1978
, OF, 2016
, OF, 2011–2012
, P, 2014–2015
, SS, 1994–2000
, P, 1999–2000
, OF, 2022-Present
, SS, 2011
, OF, 1983
, 1B, 1997
, P, 2015-2016
, OF, 2014–2016
, P, 2018
, P, 1977–1978
, P, 2022
, P, 2019
, SS, 1998
, P, 2007–2010
, P, 2011–2013
, OF, 2015
, C, 2017
, P, 2018-2019
, SS, 2011–2013
, P, 2018

S

, P, 2020-Present
, P, 2019
, P, 1993–1994
, P, 2016
, SS, 2003
, OF, 2000–2001
, P, 1997
, 1B/DH, 2022
, OF, 2019
, P, 2019
, SS, 2004–2005
, 2B, 2016
, P, 1980
, P, 2000–2003
, P, 2013
, OF, 2009–2014
, C, 1993–1994
, IF, 1990–1992
, P, 1999
, 3B, 2022-Present
, P, 1992
, P, 1988–1992
, C, 1985
, P, 2019
, P, 2016-2017
, P, 1988
, 3B, 2011–2021
 P, 2010
, 1B, 1998–1999
, P, 1977
, 2B, 2017-2018
, P, 2000–2001, 2005
, IF, 1981–1982
, P, 2021-Present
, 1B, 2005–2008
, SS, 1977
, P, 2020
, IF, 1996–1997
, OF, 1993
, P, 2019-2022
, 1B, 2009
, P, 2004–2007, 2012
, P, 1987
, P, 1993
, C, 2013
, OF, 2002
, P, 2008–2009
, P, 2017
, OF, 1979–1982
, C, 1990–1992
, P, 1999
, P, 1997–1998
, 1B, 1987–1988
, P, 2015
, P, 2021
, OF, 2019-2020
, OF, 2015–2016
, OF, 1977
, SS, 2017
, 1B, 2010–2014
, P, 2017
, OF, 2002, 2005–2006
, P, 2009–2010
, P, 1985
, 2B, 1994–1996
, P, 1988–1989
, P, 2002–2006
, 1B, 1996–1997
, OF, 2022
, OF, 2018
, P, 1999
, IF, 2004–2005
, P, 1997–1998
, 3B, 2001
, OF, 1977–1978
, P, 1982–1985
, P, 1999, 2001, 2009
, P, 2021-2022
, IF, 1977–1980
, P, 1979, 1981
, C, 1977–1980
, P, 1981–1984
, P, 2016
, 2B/OF, 2018-2020
, IF, 1995–1996
, OF, 2003, 2005
, OF, 1982
, 3B, 2022-Present
, C, 2013–2016
, OF, 2001–2012,2018-2019
, P, 1996, 1998–1999
, IF, 1994
, P, 1990–1993
, P, 2019-2022
, P, 2019
, P, 2003, 2010
, DH, 2009–2010
, C, 1982–1983
, P, 1985–1986, 1988–1991, 1998

T

, P, 2021
, OF, 1984–1986
, P, 2002–2004
, SS, 2014–2016
, P, 1988
, P, 2010
, OF, 2012
, P, 1994
, OF, 2021
, OF, 1984–1986
, P, 2008
, P, 1983–1985, 1987
, P, 1977
, P, 2004–2005
, OF, 1995
, P, 1997–1998
, OF, 1999
, OF, 1993, 1997
, P, 1985
, P, 1978
, P, 2000–2001
, UT, 2021-2022
, C, 2005
, C, 2020-2022
, P, 1995–1997
, OF, 2021-Present 
, SS/2B, 2012–2013
, OF, 2015
, OF, 1988–1989
, P, 1986–1987
, IF, 2008–2011
, P, 2018-2019
, OF, 1993–1994
, 3B, 1992
, P, 1979

U
, 2B, 2002–2003
, OF, 2022

V

, 2B, 2008
, P, 2002
, SS, 2005
, 3B, 2017
, SS/OF, 1979
, C, 1984–1993
, P, 1982–1985
, P, 2009–2012
, 1996-1997
, P, 2010
, P, 2011
, P, 1979
, IF, 2001
, P, 2016
, P, 2021
, 2B, 2007–2008
, P, 2017
, 2B, 2022
, P, 1995, 2004–2005
, 2B, 1993
, P, 2016-2018
, SS, 2018
, SS, 1989–1993
, 1B, 2016-2020

W

, P, 1996
, P, 1993
, P, 1992
, P, 2013–2016, 2020
, P, 1988
, 2B, 2019-2022
, OF, 1980–1981
, P, 2016
, P, 2006–2009
, P, 1999
, P, 2002
, P, 1999
, P, 2007
, OF, 1987
, P, 2021
, IF/OF/DH, 2015
, P, 1994–1998
, OF, 2011–2012
, P, 2008
, P, 1998
, OF, 2018
, P, 2017-2018
, P, 1977, 1980
, 1B, 2020-2021, 
, P, 2003
, P, 2007
, P, 2007, 2009–2010
, OF, 1996
, C, 1995–1996, 2000
, P, 2016
, P, 1986
 P, 2011–2015
, OF, 2008
, C, 1997–1998
, P, 1985, 1987–1988
, C, 1994
, P, 2004
, P, 2020
, P, 1999
, OF, 2019
, P, 1985
, C, 1994–2005
, OF, 1988
, SS, 2009–2011
, 1B, 1989
, IF, 2009–2010
, OF, 2022
, OF, 2011
, OF, 2022
, OF, 2003–2005
, P, 2019
, P, 1995–1997
, P, 2006–2008
, P, 1992
, IF, 2009–2010
, P, 2010–2011
, P, 2019
, DH, 2002

X

Y

, P, 2020
, C, 1986
, P, 2014
, P, 2022
, P, 1983–1986, 1990

Z

, P, 2021
, P, 1989
, P, 1999
, DH, 1981–1984
, C, 2013–2018
, P, 2015–2017

External links
BR batting statistics
BR pitching statistics

Roster
Major League Baseball all-time rosters